Russell was a federal electoral district in eastern Ontario, Canada, that was represented in the House of Commons of Canada from 1867 to 1968.

The federal riding was created by the British North America Act of 1867, and consisted initially of the County of Russell the townships of Gloucester and Osgoode in the county of Carleton. In 1903, the Rideau Ward of the city of Ottawa was added to the riding. In 1933, it was redefined to consist of the county of Russell and the part of the county of Carleton included in the township of Gloucester, excepting that part of the township of Gloucester included in the town of Eastview and the village of Rockcliffe Park. In 1947, it was expanded to include the town of Eastview in the township of Gloucester in the county of Carleton.

The federal electoral district was abolished in 1966 when it was redistributed between Glengarry—Prescott, Ottawa East and Ottawa—Carleton ridings.

Pre-confederation
District created in 1834 from Prescott & Russell.

Members of the Parliament of Upper Canada
Thomas McKay (1834–1840)

Members of the Parliament of the Province of Canada
 William Henry Draper, Conservative (1841–1843)
 William Stewart, Conservative (1843–1844)
 Archibald Petrie, Conservative  (1844–1847)
 G. B. Lyon-Fellowes, Conservative (1847–1857)
 John W. Loux (1857–1861)
 Robert Bell, Conservative (1861–1866)

Members of Parliament 

This riding elected the following members of the House of Commons of Canada:

Election results

|- 
  
|Conservative
|James Grant
|align="right"| 1,293   
 
|Unknown
|Robert Bell
|align="right"| 695   
|}

|- 
  
|Conservative
|James Grant
|align="right"|  1,217   
  
|Liberal
|Malcolm Cameron
|align="right"|952   
|}

|- 
  
|Liberal
|Robert Blackburn
|align="right"| 1,078   
  
|Conservative
|James Grant 
|align="right"| 1,014   
 
|Unknown
|W. R. Bell
|align="right"| 95    
|}

|- 
  
|Conservative
|John O'Connor
|align="right"| 1,612   
 
|Unknown
|Ira Morgan
|align="right"|1,097 
|}

|- 
  
|Conservative
|John O'Connor
|align="right"|acclaimed   
|}

|- 
  
|Conservative
|Moss Kent Dickinson
|align="right"| 1,644   
  
|Liberal
|William Cameron Edwards
|align="right"| 1,335   
|}

|- 
  
|Liberal
|William Cameron Edwards
|align="right"|  2,301   
  
|Conservative
|Charles Herbert Mackintosh
|align="right"|2,146   
|}

|- 
  
|Liberal
|William Cameron Edwards
|align="right"| 2,166   
 
|Unknown
|Charles Herbert Mackintosh
|align="right"| 1,963   
|}

|- 
  
|Liberal
|William Cameron Edwards
|align="right"|  2,308   
  
|Conservative
|Moss Kent Dickinson
|align="right"| 1,895   
|}

|- 
  
|Liberal
|William Cameron Edwards
|align="right"| 2,983   
  
|Conservative
|E. N. Hurtibise 
|align="right"| 1,380   
 
|Independent
|G. J. Wilson
|align="right"|1,093   
|}

|- 
  
|Liberal
|William Cameron Edwards
|align="right"| 3,089   
  
|Conservative
|George Halsey Perley
|align="right"|  2,523   
|}

|- 
  
|Liberal
|David Wardrope Wallace
|align="right"|acclaimed   
|}

|- 
  
|Liberal
|Norman Frank Wilson
|align="right"|  3,305   
  
|Conservative
|John E. Askwith
|align="right"|2,357   
 
|Independent
|Morris Shaver
|align="right"| 66    
|}

|- 
  
|Liberal
|Charles Murphy
|align="right"| 3,616   
  
|Conservative
|John A. Gamble
|align="right"|2,470   
|}

|- 
  
|Liberal
|Charles Murphy
|align="right"| 3,812   
  
|Conservative
|Joseph Ulric Vincent
|align="right"| 2,836   
|}

|- 
  
|Opposition (Laurier Liberals)
|Charles Murphy
|align="right"|  5,895  
  
|Government (Unionist)
|Duncan Cameron Merkley
|align="right"| 3,768 
|}

|- 
  
|Liberal
|Charles Murphy
|align="right"| 9,069   

|}

|- 
  
|Liberal
|Charles Murphy
|align="right"|acclaimed   
|}

|- 
  
|Liberal
|Alfred Goulet
|align="right"| 8,419   
  
|Conservative
|Duncan Cameron Merkley
|align="right"|6,328   
|}

|- 
  
|Liberal
|Alfred Goulet
|align="right"|  9,062   
  
|Conservative
|Wilfrid Thivierge
|align="right"|4,876   
|}

|- 
  
|Liberal
|Alfred Goulet
|align="right"| 9,551   
  
|Conservative
|Alexandre Marion
|align="right"|7,964   
|}

|- 
  
|Liberal
|Alfred Goulet
|align="right"| 5,041   
 
|Independent
|John Rudolphus Booth
|align="right"| 2,897    

  
|Conservative
|Mathias Landry
|align="right"| 1,368    
 
|Independent
|Joseph Alvary Brisson
|align="right"| 862    
|}

|- 
  
|Liberal
|Alfred Goulet
|align="right"| 6,045   

|National Government
|Frederic-A. Caillier
|align="right"|2,961  
|}

|- 
  
|Liberal
|Joseph-Omer Gour 
|align="right"|  5,519   
  
|Progressive Conservative
|Frederic-A. Caillier
|align="right"| 3,271   
 
|Independent
|Antonin Lalonde
|align="right"| 2,708   
 
|Co-operative Commonwealth
|Thomas Keenan
|align="right"|  600   

|}

|- 
  
|Liberal
|Joseph-Omer Gour 
|align="right"|12,635   
  
|Progressive Conservative
|Moïse Gendron
|align="right"| 5,767   
 
|Co-operative Commonwealth
|Ernest Cousineau
|align="right"| 1,112   

|}

|- 
  
|Liberal
|Joseph-Omer Gour
|align="right"| 15,969   
  
|Progressive Conservative
|Joseph E. Charron
|align="right"| 6,470   
 
|Co-operative Commonwealth
|Ernest Cousineau
|align="right"| 1,157   

|}

|- 
  
|Liberal
|Joseph-Omer Gour
|align="right"| 20,673   
  
|Progressive Conservative
|Wilbur Nixon
|align="right"| 12,271   
 
|Co-operative Commonwealth
|Harry Jacks
|align="right"| 1,420   

|}

|- 
  
|Liberal
|Joseph-Omer Gour
|align="right"| 21,575   
  
|Progressive Conservative
|Wilbur Nixon
|align="right"|19,464   
 
|Co-operative Commonwealth
|Harry Jacks
|align="right"| 1,224   

|}

|- 
  
|Liberal
|Paul Tardif
|align="right"| 21,070   
  
|Progressive Conservative
|Wilbur Nixon
|align="right"|14,152   
 
|Co-operative Commonwealth
|Denis Kalman
|align="right"| 1,077   
|}

|- 
  
|Liberal
|Paul Tardif
|align="right"| 29,322   
  
|Progressive Conservative
|Leo Kelly
|align="right"| 15,492   
 
|New Democratic
|Harold B. Wilson
|align="right"|3,385   

|}

|- 
  
|Liberal
|Paul Tardif
|align="right"| 31,182   
  
|Progressive Conservative
|Joe Poirier
|align="right"|  14,892   
 
|New Democratic
|Harold B. Wilson
|align="right"| 3,191   

|}

|- 
  
|Liberal
|Paul Tardif
|align="right"| 28,997   
  
|Progressive Conservative
|Kenneth Binks
|align="right"| 15,718   
 
|New Democratic
|Harold B. Wilson
|align="right"| 7,186   
|}

See also 

 List of Canadian federal electoral districts
 Past Canadian electoral districts

External links 

 Website of the Parliament of Canada

Former federal electoral districts of Ontario